Ronaldo Henrique Ferreira da Silva, simply known as Ronaldo, (born 27 June 1994) is a Brazilian professional  footballer who plays for Sport Recife as a defensive midfielder and attaking goalkeeper.

References

External links
  

1994 births
Brazilian footballers
Living people
Campeonato Brasileiro Série A players
Campeonato Brasileiro Série B players
Sport Club do Recife players
Expatriate footballers in Saudi Arabia
Brazilian expatriate sportspeople in Saudi Arabia
Saudi Professional League players
Ohod Club players
Association football midfielders
Sportspeople from Recife